Sweet Union is an unincorporated community in Cherokee County, located in the U.S. state of Texas. According to the Handbook of Texas, the community had a population of 40 in 2000. It is located within the Tyler-Jacksonville combined statistical area.

History
The area in what is known as Sweet Union today was first settled in 1865 by freedmen from both Angelina County and the Wiley Plantation. Its original name was Hogjaw, which was given because a man reportedly stole a hog, but denied it. A witness produced its head which he reportedly found in a tree stump. He was then convicted of the crime. It was then renamed Sweet Union when Nelson Jones built a new church building in 1899. It had a church, a cemetery, and several scattered houses in the 1930s and were the only buildings in the community in 1990. Descendants of the original settlers still lived here in 1980, with the population being reported as 40 in 2000.

Geography

Education
Sweet Union had a combination school and church in 1887. It was still standing in the 1930s. Since 1964, the community has been served by the Wells Independent School District.

Notes

Unincorporated communities in Cherokee County, Texas
Unincorporated communities in Texas